Nassau is the name used by several vehicles made by Chrysler. The name was first used as a trim level in the mid-1950s, denoting the high-line coupe of the Chrysler Windsor series. More recently, two different concepts by the manufacturer bear the Nassau nameplate.

2000 Nassau
The first Chrysler Nassau concept was a styling exercise penned in 2000 by Chrysler designer Robert Hubbach. The resulting vehicle became a working model used by engineers and stylists to eventually create the Chrysler 300 sedan, introduced in 2005. As with many recent models from Chrysler, very few exterior details were lost in the translation from concept car to production vehicle. One notable exterior difference between the Nassau and 300 are taillamps that wrap over the rear fenders, similar to the treatment on Cadillac CTS sport sedan.

The 2000 Nassau styling mule was housed in the Walter P. Chrysler Museum before the museum's permanent closure in 2016.

2007 Nassau

In late 2006, DaimlerChrysler announced that it would show another concept car carrying the Nassau name, this time at the 2007 North American International Auto Show. Described by Chrysler as a 'four-door coupe' (however, it is a shooting-brake), it was speculated to be a design exploration for the next-generation Chrysler 300 and Dodge Magnum. The concept was equipped with a 425 hp (315 kW) 6.1 L V8.  It was designed in Chrysler's Pacifica Advanced Design Studio in southern California by Alan Barrington (exterior) and Ben Chang (interior).

References

External links

Nassau
Nassau
Full-size vehicles
Station wagons